B. R. Nagesh was an English teacher and lecturer in the two coastal districts of Udupi and Dakshina Kannada of Karnataka, South India. His passion was theater; and is known best for his off beat plays that he had directed in Udupi, Mulki, Kundapur, Mangalore, Kasargodu, Chikmagaluru and other places in the area. His plays, often subtle, intense and throwing up various possibilities for interpretations, brought a new wave of freshness to the theater scene of the area that he catered to; in the 1970s and 1980s.

He has also written novels, short stories, humorous essays and critical and historical accounts in subjects pertaining to theater. He wrote under the pen name of Nachiketa.

Birth and death
Nagesh was born on 10 November 1931 at Mangalore and died on 10 March 2007 in his own flat at Dombivli west Thane district Mumbai, where he was residing with his wife Mrs Ramabai, along with his younger daughter's family.

Professional career
Nagesh taught in schools and colleges in the towns of Kundapur and Mulky; and he finally settled down in as an English lecturer in Poorna Prajna College in Udupi.

The nature of his theater work
Although Nagesh created his plays in an era that can now be called the B V Karanth era in Karnataka and although he could not but be impacted by the man, he tread a separate path for himself. Unlike the productions of many of his contemporaries of his era, his theatrical productions never bore the stamp of Karanth nor that of the NSD style of production that Karanth brought with him.

Based out of a small place like Udupi, Nagesh kept track of what was happening in the field of theater; the world over. His ideas, like that of his contemporary Udyavara Madhava Acharya, were original. But like Acharya, Nagesh did not extensively use dance forms as a mode of expression in his stage narratives; although he tried his hand in directing some musical plays of K Shivarama Karanth in an early stage of his life.

Nagesh often thought out-of-the-box. In the production of 'Vibrame' (Delusion), a translation of a Badal Sarkar play, he is said to have tried to stimulate the smell of the dead body by burning some raw vegetables.

Subtle humor to comment on a situation was his forte. He took great care in the stage setting, properties, costumes, lighting, visual look, colour patterns and stage movements – so much so that the designs that he created through his theatrical tools often told a story by themselves. Though he weaned towards a somber minimalist approach, he insisted that the settings and costumes be prepared afresh and so, his productions cost a lot.

He valued theater discipline and was often said to cancel rehearsals when anyone came late.

In the 1990s, his productions became rarities. After retirement, he shifted first to Bengaluru and then to Mumbai, where he died due to old age related illness.

Awards
Nagesh was the recipient of the Karnataka Theater Academy. A festival of plays in his remembrance was held in 2009 in Udupi.

Some plays directed
Tippu Sulataan for the organisation 'Rupa Ranga', Kundapur;
Musical plays of Kota Shivaram Karanth in Mulki;
Nee Mayavo, Ninnolu Maayavo [ನೀ ಮಾಯವೋ ನಿನ್ನೊಳು ಮಾಯವೋ] (Are you the 'Maya' or is 'Maya' within you?) by playwright Aadya Rangachaar;
Gummanelliha Thoramma [ಗುಮ್ಮನೆಲ್ಲಿಹ ತೋರಮ್ಮಾ] (Show me the Ghost, Mother) by playwright: Aadya Rangachaar;
Baduka Mannisu Prabhuve [ಬದುಕ ಮನ್ನಿಸು ಪ್ರಭುವೇ] (Oh Lord, help us attain Salvation) for 'Lalita Kala Sadhan', Kasaragodu;
Mundena Saki Mundena (What next, Girl?);
Aani Bantaani [ಆನೆ ಬಂತಾನೆ] (There comes the Elephant);
Kali Gulla [ಕಲಿ ಗುಳ್ಳ];
Macbeth (1983) by playwright Shakespeare for Rathabeedi Gelyaru, Udupi;
Julius Caesar in Chikmagaluru;
Hittina Hunja;
Saarvajanika Rasthe Alla (This is not a public road);
Rekke (Wings);
Tadrupi (The Duplicate);
Vibrame (Delusion)

Books on theater
Yeddu Bidda Teregalu (Curtains that got raised and closed) a historical account of theater in the coastal district of Karnataka.

Plays
Yakshi Hidida Moda (The Cloud that was held by Yakshi)

Novels
Sneha Smruthi (Friendly Memories);
Bhaavaarchane (An emotional offering);
Runayaatre (The journey of Obligation);
Mamata;
Bannada Neralu (The Coloured Shadow);
Hariva Neerige Kanasugalilla (Flowing Streams Don't Dream);

Collection of short stories
Pativrute Hengasaadaddu (When the Housewife turned into a Lady);
Rajaneeshaniguu Arthavaagada Kajji (The infection that even Rajneesh could not understand)

Legacy
The legacy of Nagesh can be found in the works of his various students or people who have been influenced by him, spread all over India – like Kannada Theater director in Mumbai Barath Kumar Polipu; Kannada, Tamil, Telugu and Malayalam film actress Vinaya Prasad; Kannada TV Actors Sujata Kurahatti  and Ravi Bhat; Ramchandra PN, and filmmaker and graduate from FTII, Eshwar Chitpady, P. B. Prasanna, Dr Sudakar Naik of Kasturba Medical Hospital, Manipal and many others.

References

2007 deaths
Writers from Karnataka
Indian theatre directors
1931 births
Indian schoolteachers